"Gone at Last" is a song by the American singer-songwriter Paul Simon. It was the lead single from his fourth studio album, Still Crazy After All These Years (1975), released on Columbia Records. Phoebe Snow and the Jessy Dixon Singers provide guest vocals, with Snow receiving credit on the single release.

Reception
Billboard described "Gone at Last" as "a combination of rock and roll and old time revival gospel."

Personnel
 Paul Simon, Phoebe Snow – duet vocals
 Richard Tee – piano, possible Hammond organ
 Gordon Edwards – bass guitar
 Grady Tate – drums
 Ralph MacDonald – tambourine, shaker
 The Jessy Dixon Singers – background vocals

Charts

Notes

References

Sources

 
 

1975 songs
1975 singles
Columbia Records singles
Paul Simon songs
Phoebe Snow songs
Song recordings produced by Paul Simon
Song recordings produced by Phil Ramone
Songs written by Paul Simon
Male–female vocal duets